Trematocara kufferathi is a species of cichlid endemic to Lake Tanganyika.  This species can reach a length of  TL. This fish's specific name honours the Belgian chemist Jean Kufferath, who was a member of the Belgian Hydrobiological Mission to Lake Tanganyika in 1946 and 1947, during which type of this species was collected.

References

kufferathi
Fish described in 1948
Taxonomy articles created by Polbot